The watt (symbol: W) is the unit of power or radiant flux in the International System of Units (SI), equal to 1 joule per second or 1 kg⋅m2⋅s−3. It is used to quantify the rate of energy transfer. The watt is named in honor of James Watt (1736–1819), an 18th-century Scottish inventor, mechanical engineer, and chemist who improved the Newcomen engine with his own steam engine in 1776. Watt's invention was fundamental for the Industrial Revolution.

Overview
When an object's velocity is held constant at one meter per second against a constant opposing force of one newton, the rate at which work is done is one watt.
 

In terms of electromagnetism, one watt is the rate at which electrical work is performed when a current of one ampere (A) flows across an electrical potential difference of one volt (V), meaning the watt is equivalent to the volt-ampere (the latter unit, however, is used for a different quantity from the real power of an electrical circuit).
 

Two additional unit conversions for watt can be found using the above equation and Ohm's law.
 
where ohm is the SI derived unit of electrical resistance.

Examples 
A person having a mass of 100 kg who climbs a 3-meter-high ladder in 5 seconds is doing work at a rate of about 600 watts. Mass times acceleration due to gravity times height divided by the time it takes to lift the object to the given height gives the rate of doing work or power.
 A labourer over the course of an eight-hour day can sustain an average output of about 75 watts; higher power levels can be achieved for short intervals and by athletes.

Origin and adoption as an SI unit
The watt is named after the Scottish inventor James Watt. The unit name was proposed initially by C. William Siemens in August 1882 in his President's Address to the Fifty-Second Congress of the British Association for the Advancement of Science. Noting that units in the practical system of units were named after leading physicists, Siemens proposed that watt might be an appropriate name for a unit of power. Siemens defined the unit consistently within the then-existing system of practical units as "the power conveyed by a current of an Ampère through the difference of potential of a Volt".

In October 1908, at the International Conference on Electric Units and Standards in London, so-called "international" definitions were established for practical electrical units. Siemens' definition was adopted as the "international" watt. (Also used: 1 A2 × 1 Ω.) The watt was defined as equal to 107 units of power in the "practical system" of units.  The "international units" were dominant from 1909 until 1948. After the 9th General Conference on Weights and Measures in 1948, the "international" watt was redefined from practical units to absolute units (i.e., using only length, mass, and time). Concretely, this meant that 1 watt was now defined as the quantity of energy transferred in a unit of time, namely 1 J/s. In this new definition, 1 "absolute" watt = 1.00019 "international" watts. Texts written before 1948 are likely to be using the "international" watt, which implies caution when comparing numerical values from this period with the post-1948 watt. In 1960, the 11th General Conference on Weights and Measures adopted the "absolute" watt into the International System of Units (SI) as the unit of power.

Multiples 

Attowatt The sound intensity in water corresponding to the international standard reference sound pressure of 1 μPa is approximately 0.65 aW/m2.
Femtowatt Powers that are measured in femtowatts are typically found in references to radio and radar receivers. For example, meaningful FM tuner performance figures for sensitivity, quieting and signal-to-noise require that the RF energy applied to the antenna input be specified. These input levels are often stated in dBf (decibels referenced to 1 femtowatt). This is 0.2739 microvolts across a 75-ohm load or 0.5477 microvolt across a 300-ohm load; the specification takes into account the RF input impedance of the tuner.
Picowatt Powers that are measured in picowatts are typically used in reference to radio and radar receivers, acoustics and in the science of radio astronomy. One picowatt is the international standard reference value of sound power when this quantity is expressed as a level in decibels.
Nanowatt Powers that are measured in nanowatts are also typically used in reference to radio and radar receivers.
Microwatt Powers that are measured in microwatts are typically stated in medical instrumentation systems such as the electroencephalograph (EEG) and the electrocardiograph (ECG), in a wide variety of scientific and engineering instruments and also in reference to radio and radar receivers. Compact solar cells for devices such as calculators and watches are typically measured in microwatts.
Milliwatt A typical laser pointer outputs about five milliwatts of light power, whereas a typical hearing aid uses less than one milliwatt. Audio signals and other electronic signal levels are often measured in dBm, referenced to one milliwatt.
Kilowatt

The kilowatt is typically used to express the output power of engines and the power of electric motors, tools, machines, and heaters. It is also a common unit used to express the electromagnetic power output of broadcast radio and television transmitters.  One kilowatt is approximately equal to 1.34 horsepower. A small electric heater with one heating element can use 1 kilowatt. The average electric power consumption of a household in the United States is about 1 kilowatt.  A surface area of 1 square meter on Earth receives typically about one kilowatt of sunlight from the Sun (the solar irradiance) (on a clear day at midday, close to the equator).
Megawatt Many events or machines produce or sustain the conversion of energy on this scale, including large electric motors; large warships such as aircraft carriers, cruisers, and submarines; large server farms or data centers; and some scientific research equipment, such as supercolliders, and the output pulses of very large lasers. A large residential or commercial building may use several megawatts in electric power and heat. The earliest citing of the megawatt in the Oxford English Dictionary (OED) is a reference in the 1900 Webster's International Dictionary of the English Language. The OED also states that megawatt appeared in a 28 November 1947 article in the journal Science (506:2).

Gigawatt A gigawatt is typical average power for an industrial city of one million habitants and also the output of a large power station. The GW unit is thus used for large power plants and power grids. For example, by the end of 2010, power shortages in China's Shanxi province were expected to increase to 5–6 GW and the installation capacity of wind power in Germany was 25.8 GW. The largest unit (out of four) of the Belgian Doel Nuclear Power Station has a peak output of 1.04 GW. HVDC converters have been built with power ratings of up to 2 GW.
Terawatt The primary energy used by humans worldwide was about 160,000 terawatt-hours in 2019, corresponding to an average continuous power consumption of 18 TW that year. The most powerful lasers from the mid-1960s to the mid-1990s produced power in terawatts, but only for nanosecond intervals. The average lightning strike peaks at 1 TW, but these strikes only last for 30 microseconds.
Petawatt A petawatt can be produced by the current generation of lasers for time scales on the order of picoseconds. One such laser is the Lawrence Livermore's Nova laser, which achieved a power output of 1.25 PW by a process called chirped pulse amplification.  The duration of the pulse was roughly 0.5 ps, giving a total energy of 600 J.  Another example is the Laser for Fast Ignition Experiments (LFEX) at the Institute of Laser Engineering (ILE), Osaka University, which achieved a power output of 2 PW for a duration of approximately 1 ps.  Based on the average total solar irradiance of 1.361 kW/m2, the total power of sunlight striking Earth's atmosphere is estimated at 174 PW.   The planet's average rate of global warming, measured as Earth's energy imbalance,  reached about 0.5 PW (0.3% of incident solar power) by 2019.
Yottawatt The power output of the Sun is 382.8 YW.

Conventions in the electric power industry  
In the electric power industry, megawatt electrical (MWe or MWe) refers by convention to the electric power produced by a generator, while megawatt thermal or thermal megawatt (MWt, MWt, or MWth, MWth) refers to thermal power produced by the plant. For example, the Embalse nuclear power plant in Argentina uses a fission reactor to generate 2109 MWt (i.e. heat), which creates steam to drive a turbine, which generates 648 MWe (i.e. electricity). (See Betz's law for the associated efficiency.) Other SI prefixes are sometimes used, for example gigawatt electrical (GWe). The International Bureau of Weights and Measures, which maintains the SI-standard, states that further information about a quantity should not be attached to the unit symbol but instead to the quantity symbol (i.e., Pthermal = 270 W rather than P = 270 Wth) and so these units are non-SI. In compliance with SI, the energy company Ørsted A/S uses the unit megawatt for produced electrical power and the equivalent unit megajoule per second for delivered heating power in a combined heat and power station such as Avedøre Power Station.

When describing alternating current (AC) electricity, another distinction is made between the watt and the volt-ampere. While these units are equivalent for simple resistive circuits, they differ when loads exhibit electrical reactance.

Radio transmission

Radio stations usually report the power of their transmitters in units of watts, referring to the effective radiated power.  This refers to the power that a half-wave dipole antenna would need to radiate to match the intensity of the transmitter's main lobe.

Distinction between watts and watt-hours
The terms power and energy are closely related but distinct physical quantities. Power is the rate at which energy is generated or consumed and hence is measured in units (e.g. watts) that represent energy per unit time.

This same amount of energy would light a 40-watt bulb for 2.5 hours, or a 50-watt bulb for 2 hours.

Power stations are rated using units of power, typically megawatts or gigawatts (for example, the Three Gorges Dam in China, is rated at approximately 22 gigawatts). This reflects the maximum power output it can achieve at any point in time. A power station's annual energy output, however, would be recorded using units of energy (not power), typically gigawatt hours. Major energy production or consumption is often expressed as terawatt hours for a given period; often a calendar year or financial year. One terawatt hour of energy is equal to a sustained power delivery of one terawatt for one hour, or approximately 114 megawatts for a period of one year:

 Power output = energy / time

 1 terawatt hour per year = 1×1012 W·h / (365 days × 24 hours per day) ≈ 114 million watts,
equivalent to approximately 114 megawatts of constant power output.

The watt-second is  a unit of energy, equal to the joule. One kilowatt hour is 3,600,000 watt seconds.

While a watt per hour is a unit of rate of change of power with time), it is not correct to refer to a watt (or watt-hour) as a "watt per hour".

See also

 Kibble balance (formerly known as a watt balance)
 Nominal power (photovoltaic)
 Power factor
 Solar constant
 Wattage conversion factors
 Wattmeter

Explanatory notes

References

External links

 
 

SI derived units
Units of power
James Watt